Odsal is an area of the City of Bradford, West Yorkshire, England.

Odsal Stadium is the home of Bradford rugby league club. The Richard Dunn Sports Centre is named after the boxer who lived in Bradford at the time of his 1976 bout against Muhammad Ali.

Sport

Amateur rugby league side Odsal Sedbergh, founded in 1980, play their game on Cleckheaton Road and, as of 2017, compete in the Yorkshire Men's League First Division

References

Areas of Bradford